Rough Diamond is a television series co-produced by BBC Northern Ireland and RTÉ. The series also appears on RTÉ One in the Republic of Ireland

The story explores the relationship between discredited racehorse trainer Aidan Doherty and Jonah Price, the son he never knew existed. The first episode begins with Doherty about to sell his run down stables to his neighbour and former employer Charlie Carrick, wealthy owner of the neighbouring Firebrand stables, and move to New South Wales. However, his best laid plans change when a young man appears, later revealed to be his son, Price.

The series is directed by Simon Massey and Dermot Boyd and produced by Peter Norris.

Cast

External links
 
BBC Press Office, Rough Diamond Press Pack. Retrieved 5 February 2007.
Rough Diamond at Internet Movie Database. Retrieved 5 February 2007.
 

2007 British television series debuts
BBC television dramas